Chika Nina Unigwe  (born 12 June 1974) is a Nigerian-born Igbo author who writes in English and Dutch. In April 2014 she was selected for the Hay Festival's Africa39 list of 39 Sub-Saharan African writers aged under 40 with potential and talent to define future trends in African literature. Previously based in Belgium, she now lives in the United States.

Biography
Chika Unigwe was born in 1974 in Enugu, Nigeria, the sixth of her parents' seven children. She attended secondary school at Federal Government Girls' college in Abuja and obtained a BA in English in the University of Nigeria, Nsukka in 1995. In 1996, she earned an MA degree in English from the KU Leuven (KUL, the Catholic University of Leuven). She has a Ph.D in Literature (2004) from the University of Leiden in the Netherlands. Her debut novel, De Feniks, was published in 2005 by Meulenhoff and Manteau (of Amsterdam and Antwerp, respectively) and was shortlisted for the Vrouw en Kultuur debuutprijs for the best first novel by a female writer. She is also the author of two children's books published by Macmillan, London.

She has published short fiction in several anthologies, journals and magazines, including Wasafiri (University of London), Moving Worlds (University of Leeds), Per Contra, Voices of the University of Wisconsin and Okike of the University of Nigeria.

She won the 2003 BBC Short Story Competition and a Commonwealth Short Story Competition award. In 2004, she was shortlisted for the Caine Prize for African Writing. In the same year, her short story made the top 10 of the Million Writers Award for best online fiction. In 2005, she won third prize in the Equiano Fiction Contest.

Her first novel, De Feniks, was published in Dutch in September 2005 and is the first book of fiction written by a Flemish author of African origin. Her second novel, Fata Morgana, was published in Dutch in 2008 and subsequently released in English as On Black Sisters' Street. On Black Sisters' Street is about African prostitutes living and working in Belgium, and was published to acclaim in London in 2009 by Jonathan Cape. On Black Sisters' Street won the 2012 Nigeria Prize for Literature; valued at $100,000 it is Africa's largest literary prize.

Also in 2012, Zukiswa Wanner in The Guardian rated Unigwe as one of the "top five African writers". Still in 2012, she floored Olushola Olugbesan's Only A Canvass and Ngozi Achebe's Onaedo: The Blacksmith's Daughter to clinch the coveted $100,000 Nigeria Liquified Natural Gas NLNG Nigeria Prize for Literature, becoming the second Diaspora writer to win the prize.

She attended the 2013 Adelaide festival in Australia and for the first time met an Aboriginal chief. She was so moved by the story of the Aborigin in Australia and she wrote an article titled "what I'm thinking about ... forgiveness and healing".

Unigwe sits on the Board of Trustees of pan-African literary initiative Writivism, and set up the Awele Creative Trust in Nigeria to support young writers. In April 2014, she was selected for the Festival's Africa39 list of 39 sub-Saharan African writers aged under 40 with potential and talent to define future trends in Africa.

In autumn 2014 the University of Tübingen welcomed Unigwe and her fellow authors Taiye Selasi, Priya Basil and Nii Ayikwei Parkes to the year's Writers' Lectureship, all of them authors representing what Selasi calls Afropolitan literature. In the same year, she published Zwarte Messias, a novel about Olaudah Equiano.

In 2016, Unigwe was appointed as the Bonderman Professor of Creative Writing at Brown University in Providence, Rhode Island. Her novel Night Dancer (published in 2012) was also shortlisted for the NLNG Nigeria Prize for Literature; the winner was subsequently announced as Abubakar Adam Ibrahim.

She was also a Man Booker International judge that year. In 2017, she was a visiting professor at Emory University, Atlanta, Georgia, and stayed until 2019.

In 2019, Cassava Republic Press in Abuja and London published Better Never Than Late, a new collection of linked short stories about Nigerian immigrants in Belgium. In the same year she contributed to New Daughters of Africa, which was nominated for the NAACP Awards for Outstanding Literary Work. It is a compilation of orature and literature by more than 200 women from Africa and the African diaspora, edited and introduced by Margaret Busby, also the editor of the 1992 anthology Daughters of Africa, who compared the process of assembling it to "trying to catch a flowing river in a calabash".

In 2020, Unigwe contributed to The middle of a sentence: short prose anthology with "Two Happy Meals". The Common Breath Short Prose Anthology is a celebration of fiction in its shortest form, uniting work from some of the greatest contemporary novelists, alongside an exciting selection from TCB's open submissions process, and supplemented by pieces from a range of literary history's finest artists. In July of the same year, Ungwe was appointed a professor of creative writing at Georgia College & State University in Milledgeville, Georgia.

In November 2020, she began writing a weekly column for Nigeria's Daily Trust. In 2021, Unigwe was shortlisted for the Dzanc Books Diverse Voices Award.

Personal life
Unigwe formerly lived in Turnhout, Belgium, with her husband and four children. She emigrated to the United States in 2013. She writes in English and Dutch.

Fellowships 
 2007: Unesco-Aschberg Fellowship for creative writing
 2009: Rockefeller Foundation Fellowship (Bellagio Centre, Italy)
 2011: HALD Fellowship (HALD Centre, Denmark)
 2011 and 2016: Writing Fellowship at the Ledig House (Omi NY, USA)
 2013: Writing Fellowing at Cove Park (Scotland)
 2014: Writer-in-Residence, Haverford College (Philadelphia PA, USA)
 2014: Sylt Fellowship for African Writers

Bibliography 
Tear Drops, Enugu: Richardson Publishers, 1993.
Born in Nigeria, Enugu: Onyx Publishers, 1995.
A Rainbow for Dinner. Oxford: Macmillan, 2002. 
In the Shadow of Ala; Igbo women's writing as an act of righting. Dissertation, Leiden University, 2004.
Thinking of Angel, 2005.
Dreams, 2004.
The Phoenix. Lagos: Farafina Publishers, 2007. 
On Black Sisters Street (translation of Fata Morgana). London: Jonathan Cape, 2009. 
Night Dancer. London: Jonathan Cape, 2012. 
Black Messiah (2014)
Zwart, Amsterdam: Uitgeverij Atlas Contact, 2018. A collection of stories and essays in Dutch, collected and edited by Vamba Sherif and Ebissé Rouw. . Contains a story by Unigwe: Anekdotes om rond de tafel te vertellen.
Better Never Than Late. Cassava Republic Press, 2019. 
The Middle Of A Sentence: Short Prose Anthology. The Common Breath, 2020.

References

External links 
 Author's website
 
 Writivism 

1974 births
Living people
Writers from Enugu
Igbo women writers
Nigerian emigrants to Belgium
Nigerian writers
Nigerian women writers
Brown University faculty
Georgia College & State University faculty
Igbo people
21st-century Nigerian writers